Åke Olivestedt (4 June 1924 – 28 June 1998) was a Swedish cyclist. He competed in the individual and team road race events at the 1948 Summer Olympics.

References

External links
 

1924 births
1998 deaths
Swedish male cyclists
Olympic cyclists of Sweden
Cyclists at the 1948 Summer Olympics
Sportspeople from Stockholm